Teodora Draizera (also known as Draizera (2000-2008)) is a station on the Livoberezhna Line of the Kyiv Light Rail system. It was opened on May 26, 2000 and reopened after a significant modernization of the line on October 26, 2012.

Teodora Draizera is located in between the Oleksandra Saburova and Kashtanova stations. It is named in honor of Theodore Dreiser, an American novelist and journalist.

At one point the Kyiv City authorities proposed creating the "Vulytsia Draizera" station of the Kyiv Metro's Livoberezhna Line, although that entire project was scrapped in favor of expanding the existing light rail system.

References

External links
 
 

Kyiv Light Rail stations
Railway stations opened in 2000
2000 establishments in Ukraine